Mayeux is a French surname. Notable people with the surname include:

Melissa Mayeux (born 1998), French baseball player
Chase Mayeux, American entrepreneur, DeFi early adopter 
Molly Mayeux, American film producer

See also
Saint-Mayeux, a commune of Côtes-d'Armor, Brittany, France

French-language surnames